Edmund Francis Vesey Knox (23 January 1865 – 15 May 1921) was an Irish nationalist politician. Initially a member of the Irish Parliamentary Party, he sided with the Anti-Parnellite Irish National Federation majority when the party split in 1891.

He was elected as Member of Parliament (MP) for West Cavan at an unopposed by-election on 26 March 1890, following the death of the nationalist MP Joseph Biggar, taking his seat in the House of Commons of the United Kingdom of Great Britain and Ireland.

He was re-elected as an Irish National Federation MP at the 1892 general election, with a majority of more than three-to-one over his sole opponent, a Unionist.  At the 1895 election he was again returned unopposed in West Cavan, but also stood in Londonderry City, winning that seat by a slender majority over his unionist opponent.  He chose to sit for Londonderry City, and held that seat until he resigned from Parliament on 9 December 1898 by becoming Steward of the Manor of Northstead.

References

External links 

 

1865 births
1921 deaths
UK MPs 1886–1892
UK MPs 1892–1895
UK MPs 1895–1900
Irish Parliamentary Party MPs
Anti-Parnellite MPs
Members of the Parliament of the United Kingdom for County Cavan constituencies (1801–1922)
Members of the Parliament of the United Kingdom for County Londonderry constituencies (1801–1922)